Smiling Maniacs is a 1975 Italian drama crime film. It stars actor Franco Nero.

Cast
 Franco Nero as Judge Dani
 Fernando Rey as Judge Vanini
 Martin Balsam as Carlo Goja
 Gabriele Ferzetti as Prandó
 Umberto Orsini as Erzi
 Mara Danaud as Flavia
 Giovanna Benedetto as  Elena Vanini
 Umberto D'Orsi as 'Eccellenza'

References

External links

1975 films
Italian drama films
1970s Italian-language films
Films scored by Pino Donaggio
Italian films based on plays
1970s Italian films